Morton Independent School District is a public school district based in Morton, Texas, United States.

In 2009, the school district was rated "academically acceptable" by the Texas Education Agency.

Schools
Morton High School (grades 9-12)
Morton Junior High School (grades 6-8)
Morton Elementary School (grades prekindergarten-5)

References

External links
Morton ISD

School districts in Cochran County, Texas